Taana is a 2020 Tamil romantic comedy film directed by Yuvaraj Subramani. The film stars Vaibhav and Nandita Swetha in the lead roles.

Plot 

Sakthi (Vaibhav) is the only son in the family of cops but he refuses to join the force due to his voice disorder. Yes, if Sakthi gets anxious or tensed, he speaks in a female voice. The film is all about how Sakthi overcome his shortcomings and join the police force only to find the criminals behind the murder of an innocent girl.

Cast 

 Vaibhav as Shaktivel
Surendar kpy as young Shaktivel (Flashback)
 Nandita Swetha as Nivetha
 Yogi Babu as Dooma
 Pandiarajan as Shakti's father
 Hareesh Peradi
 Vela Ramamoorthy
 Pasanga Sivakumar
 Uma as Shakthi's mother 
 Sandra as Anitha
Arun
Aravind
Vignesh Karthick
Kalairani
 Florent Pereira

Production 
Vaibhav was signed to work on a film titled Taana directed by Yuvaraj, an associate of Selvaraghavan in 2018. The film was titled Taana, which is based on the Tamil term Taanakaran (Police). Nandita Swetha, Pandiarajan, Yogi Babu, and Hareesh Peradi were signed to play supporting roles with the latter portraying a negative role and Pandiarajan portraying the father of Vaibhav's character. The film was shot in Ranipet.

Soundtrack
Vishal Chandrasekhar was roped in to compose the music and notably used 40 violins for the song ‘Nee Mayakkura’. 
The lyrics for all songs were written by Ku. Karthik. 

Nee Mayakkura - Sinduri
Tik Tok - Yogi, Roshini	
Vandhaachu Taana Kutti - Ann Benson, Sriranjani, Aneha	
Taana - Velu, Balaji Sri	
Accham Pisaasada - Velu	
Mistero - MCD

References

External links 

2020s Tamil-language films
2020 romantic comedy films
Indian romantic comedy films
2020 films
Films scored by Vishal Chandrasekhar